Staouéli (Berber: ⵚⵟⴰⵡⴰⵍⵉ) is a municipality in Algiers Province, Algeria. It is located in Zéralda district, on a Presque-isle on the Mediterranean Sea, hosting the resort town of Sidi Fredj. There was a Grand Prix circuit located in Staouéli. Grands Prix was held there from 1928 to 1930, but the circuit is no longer operational.

In 1843, the Trappists obtained a grant of 2500 acres of land on the site of the Battle of Staouéli (fought on June 19, 1830, during the French conquest of Algeria). Here they have built a monastery where some 100 monks lived and worked. On the wall of the monastery is the inscription: S'il est triste de vivre à la Trappe, qu'il est doux d'y mourir (While it is sad to live here, it is sweet to die here).

See also

 Battle of Staouéli

References

Motorsport venues in Algeria
Communes of Algiers Province
Cities in Algeria
Algeria